Jade Kathleen Leitao (born July 13, 1983) is a Cape Verdean female basketball player. She participated with the Cape Verde team in the 2005, 2007, 2013, 2019 and 2021 African Championships.

External links
Profile at fiba.com

1983 births
Living people
Basketball players from Inglewood, California
Cape Verdean women's basketball players
American sportswomen
21st-century American women